Mordellistena fusca is a beetle in the genus Mordellistena of the family Mordellidae. It was described in 1895 by Lea. It has been noted for its relatively vibrant coloration compared to other members of the genus.

References

fusca
Beetles described in 1895